Pedro Ferrer (1903 – death date unknown) was a Cuban second baseman in the Negro leagues in the 1920s.

A native of Havana, Cuba, Ferrer played for the Cuban Stars (East) in 1925. In 21 recorded games, he posted nine hits and three RBI in 67 plate appearances.

References

External links
 and Seamheads

1903 births
Date of birth missing
Year of death missing
Place of death missing
Cuban Stars (East) players
Baseball second basemen
Baseball players from Havana